Gabriel Temudzani (born 10 February 1980) is a South African actor and TV presenter.

He is known for his role of Chief Vhafuwi Azwindini since 2000, on the TV soap opera Muvhango aired on SABC 2, on which he has been an actor since 2000.

Early life

Temudzani was born in 1980 and bred in Tshivhilidulu in the Nzhelele area, in Venda.

Career

In 1995,He began his acting career and made his screen acting debut in 2000.

He acted in the feature film A Diamond and Destiny in 2003, about the discovery of gold and diamond in Kimberly. In 2009, he landed a lead role in the feature film Night Drive.

In theatre he has appeared in the show The Dog and The Night of Horror, for which he won a Vita award.

And now he is currently a lead actor on Muvhango and presents the magazine show La Famila, which also airs on SABC2.He is the presenter on La Familia from Shandukani Nesengani, starting with Season 3 in 2010.

Personal life
Gabriel married Refilwe Temudzani in 2013 and Bongiwe Matsebula in 2020.

Filmography

Television

film

Awards and nominations
 He won vita awards for his role on The Dog and The Night of Horror.

References

External links
 

1980 births
Living people
South African television presenters
South African male soap opera actors
People from Limpopo